Photron is an international company that manufactures high-speed digital cameras based in Tokyo, Japan, with offices in San Diego, California & United Kingdom.  The Photron FASTCAM cameras are used for capturing high speed images and playing these images in slow motion.  Use of a High-speed camera can be found in a broad variety of industries.  A few of the industries include: flow visualization, flame propagation, ballistics, firearm studies, material science, weapon development, biological science, biophysics, vehicle impact studies (crash safety), manufacturing, mining, automotive, and scientific research.

History 

Photron is a business unit of IMAGICA Robot Holdings, Inc.,  The Imagica Robot Group started about 70 years ago at Kyoto Uzumasa, Japan, the center of the Japanese film industry, when it began film processing businesses such as film developing.  Photron was founded in 1974.  Photron began manufacturing professional film, video and photo-instrumentation equipment in Japan.  Photron  expanded into photo optics and electronic technologies including the manufacture of high speed digital cameras.  There is a mutual benefit between Photron and their parent company Imagica in sharing technology such as color science, broadcast expertise and image processing. Photron name combines photon and electron, the fundamental process of creating electronic digital images from light. Photron's early high-speed cameras were only available in Japan.  Photron advanced their sensor technology in 1990 by working with Kinki University in Japan on a new design based on a block readout multichannel NMOS architecture.  This new development produced a 256 pixel x 256 pixel x 4500 fps NMOS sensor which surpassed the fastest high-speed camera at that time, the Eastman Kodak SP2000 Motion analyzer (240 x 192 x 2000 fps).  After 1991, Photron continued to manufacture and sell high-speed cameras into Asia.  However, Photron wanted to make available their new sensor technology to serve other applications outside ASIA. Photron reached an agreement with Eastman Kodak MASD to manufacture for MASD two high-speed cameras, the HS 4540 and the Motioncorder trade branded as Kodak Ektapro products.  These two products were sold by Eastman Kodak MASD into Europe, North America and parts of Asia until 2000. Photron assume worldwide responsibility of their products after 2000, naming the HS 4540 as the Photron FASTCAM SE and the Motioncorder as the Photron FASTCAM Super 10K.

Photron timeline 

 July 1968,	Osawa Laboratories, the predecessor of Photron, founded by J. Osawa & Co. as a subsidiary.
 June 1974,	Photron Limited, a subsidiary of J. Osawa & Co., was founded.
 September 1983,	Osawa Laboratories and Photron Limited merged to form Photron Limited as a subsidiary of J. Osato & Co.
 May 1984,	Chisan Limited acquired the whole stock of Photron Limited from J. Osawa & Co.
 June 1985,	Closed Komae Plant and opened Ebina Plant in Ebina City, Kanagawa Prefecture. Opened Nagoya branch office.
 April 1987,	Signed distributorship agreement with Rank Cintel Limited (Cintel International now - UK) to sell Cintel telecine equipment in Japan.
 December 1988,	Opened San Jose, California, Branch Office to sell products and collect market and technical information.
 March 1991,	Opened Yonezawa Plant in Yamagata Prefecture to expand production capacity.
 July 1992,	IMAGICA Corp. acquired all stock from Chisan Limited to own Photron Limited.
 July 1994,	Opened Fukuoka Branch Office in Fukuoka City, Fukuoka Prefecture.
 September 1997,	Company made public by offering stock over the counter.
 December 1997,	Started sales of SLSM Super Slow Motion System made by EVS, a Belgian company.
 January 2000,	Established Photron USA, Inc., a subsidiary, in San Jose, California, USA to expand the sales power in Americas.
 May 2000,	Acquired I-Chips Technology Limited, a fabless developer-manufacturer of general-purpose LSI for imaging equipment, as a subsidiary.
 April 2001,	Established Photron Europe Limited, a subsidiary, in a suburban city of London, UK, to expand sales power in the European markets.
 November 2001,	Established Photron Vietnam Technical Center Limited, as a local center for under-contract product development and design works.
 March 2002,	Acquired ISO9001:2000 Product Quality Management certificate.
 September 2003,	Moved the Head Office and R&D Studio (Ebina Plant) to the present location at Fujimi, Chiyoda-Ku, Tokyo.
 August 2007,	Established Photron Medical Imaging Inc., a subsidiary.
 January 2010,	ISO certificate status changed to ISO9001:2008.
 April 2011,	Became a fully owned subsidiary of Imagica-Robot Holdings through demerger and merger.
 July 2012,	Merged with IMAGICA DIGIX Inc.
 2020,    Acquired Photonic Lattice, Inc.

Cameras and applications 

Over last 10 years, Photron has been recognized for their contributions to high speed imaging. Photron high-speed cameras can operate 20,000 fps at 1024 x 1024 pixel at 12-bit pixel resolution to ultra high-speed cameras operating over 2.1 million frames per second.  Designers, manufacturers, and R&D/Test engineers use high-speed cameras to proof their designs with motion analysis, solving the issues that can only been viewed in non-real time slow motion.  Cameras vary by size, resolution and Frames Per Second (fps.  An example is the SA5-RV which is used in extreme environments where heat or vibration can't be managed.

References

External links 
 

Electronics companies of Japan
Film and video technology
Digital cameras
Imagica Robot Holdings